Oliarces is a genus of moth lacewings in the family Ithonidae, containing a single described species, O. clara.

References

Further reading

 

Ithonidae
Monotypic Neuroptera genera
Articles created by Qbugbot